WXXJ may refer to:

 WXXJ (FM), a radio station (106.5 FM) licensed to serve Ponte Vedra Beach, Florida, United States
 WEZI (FM), a radio station (102.9 FM) licensed to serve Jacksonville, Florida, which held the call sign WXXJ from 2009 to 2017